Dace is a feminine Latvian given name and may refer to: 
Dace Akmentiņa (1858–1936), Latvian actress
Dace Melbārde (born 1971), Latvian politician
Dace Munča, Latvian curler 
Dace Regža (born 1962), Latvian curler and curling coach
Dace Reinika (born 1958), Latvian politician
Dace Ruskule (born 1981), Latvian discus thrower

Latvian feminine given names